The Engine Room is an Australian jazz trio made up of Roger Frampton, John Pochee and Steve Elphick who were the rhythm section of Ten Part Invention. Their album Full Steam Ahead was nominated for the 1996 ARIA Award for Best Jazz Album.

Members
Roger Frampton - piano
John Pochee - drums
Steve Elphick - bass

Discography

Awards and nominations

ARIA Music Awards
The ARIA Music Awards is an annual awards ceremony that recognises excellence, innovation, and achievement across all genres of Australian music. They commenced in 1987. 

! 
|-
| 1996
| Full Steam Ahead
| Best Jazz Album
| 
| 
|-

References

Australian jazz ensembles